Elizabeth Knight (1 November 1944 – 22 August 2005) was a British film and television actress.

Life and career
Elizabeth Knight was born on 1 November 1944 in Oxford, Oxfordshire. She made her first film appearance in the 1968 musical Oliver! as Charlotte, maid to Mr. Sowerberry (played by Leonard Rossiter), and also appeared in the Richard Burton gangster film Villain in 1971. Her last film was the 1979 feature-length version of popular British sitcom Porridge.

Her appearances in two of the much-loved Carry On film series won her lasting recognition. She played Jane, part of Barbara Windsor's Chayste Place troupe, in Carry On Camping (May 1969). She played Nurse Willing, who assists patient Wilfrid Brambell, in Carry On Again Doctor (August 1969).

She made numerous television appearances. Her first was in a 1965 production of Charley's Aunt; her last dramatic role was in the 1980 BBC production of Pride and Prejudice. She starred alongside Joanna Lumley in 1971 Jilly Cooper-penned sitcom It's Awfully Bad For Your Eyes, Darling.

Death
Elizabeth Knight died on 22 August 2005 in Hammersmith, London. She died of heart disease.

Filmography

TV credits

References

External links

Elizabeth Knight on the British Film Institute website

1944 births
2005 deaths
English film actresses
English television actresses
20th-century English actresses
People from Oxford